Madina Central College is a school situated in Kandy district, Madawala, Sri Lanka. It is a mixed school that has about 3,150 students and about 120  teachers. The principal and vice principal are Abdul Raheem and Mr. J.M. Zarook. The school offers primary and secondary education. Students from far away places like Digana, Udathalawinna, Kandy, Katugastota are students.

The school holds cricket matches with Azhar college every year, but it has now stopped. At the beginning of every year, the school holds the annual sports meet, and at the end of every year the school holds its annual prize giving.

History 
In the 1930s, a revolutionary thinker and social worker, Abubakkar Lebbai Sayyadhu Mohammed, established the school on 12 February 1935. The first principal was A.K. Subramaniyam. During its early stages, admission was only granted to boys. At the beginning, there were three teachers and 36 students. In 1936, the school was improved with an addition of one teacher (four total) and 170 students (215 total). In 1937, a Teachers and Parents Association was created. In 1944, S.S.C classes began. In 1948, with 423 students and 15 teachers, a new block was constructed.

In 1952 the school was divided in two as upper school and lower school and had 14 classes. In 1958, girls were allowed to join the school. During that time, the educational minister Mr. Dasanayaka constructed a new block to the school. In 1994, the school was announced as a national school. The principal was A.H.M. Siddeek(1997–2008). In 2003, a building was constructed with a new block and was separated for the English Medium. 

An auditorium was opened in 2004 in memory of M.H.M.Ashraff, who was the founder of Sri Lanka Muslim Congress.

Past Principals

Achievements 
Siraj Sahab was elected as the Mobitel school boy cricketer of the year in the silver division on 20.10.2014.

2004-present 
A computer lab was opened in 2004. In 2008 Mr.Ali Jinna was the principal. In the period 2008-2010, Old Boys Association members Alhaj Musni Mulaffar and Alhaj Riffthi Mulaffar gifted a bus to the school which was worth 40 lakhs. The school now has about 3150 students and about 120 teachers. In the early 2015, a technological laboratory was constructed by the Sri Lankan government which was led by the former president Mahindha Rajapaksa.It contains 4 rooms including a math room. It also contains 40 computers.

References

External links
 http://www.kmccnetwork.com
 http://slk.jantareview.com/Kandy/biz_474120/Madina-Central-College-(National-School)
 http://omlanka.com/medinaprizegiving101211.html
 http://www.sundayobserver.lk/2010/04/18/spo21.asp
 http://www.mclloydbis.com/profile/305651/k-madina-central-college.html
 https://web.archive.org/web/20110927001747/http://www.sundayobserver.lk/2011/09/25/jun47.pdf
 http://www.island.lk/2010/04/22/sports4.html

Schools in Kandy District